The Wallacean drongo or Greater Wallacean drongo (Dicrurus densus) is a species of bird in the family Dicruridae. It can be found in the countries of Indonesia and East Timor. It was formerly considered to be conspecific with the hair-crested drongo (Dicrurus hottentottus).

Its natural habitats are subtropical or tropical moist lowland forests, subtropical or tropical mangrove forests, and subtropical or tropical moist montane forests.

Conservation Status 
The Wallacean drongo has a very large range and does not approach the thresholds for Vulnerable under the range size criterion. Its extent of occurrence is greater than 20,000 km2. The population trend is not known but it is not believed to be declining sufficiently rapidly, and the population size is believed to be large enough for it to not qualify as Vulnerable using the population size criterion. For these reasons the species is classified as Least Concern by the IUCN.

Subspecies 
The following six subspecies are recognized:
 D. densus densus (Bonaparte, 1850) Wallacean drongo
Roti, Timor, Wetar, and Sermata
 D. densus vicinus (Rensch, 1928) Lesser Sunda drongo
Lombok, Lesser Sunda Islands
 D. densus bimaensis (Wallace, 1864) Bima drongo
Sumbawa, Komodo, Rinca, Flores, Pantar, Alor, and Gunungapi
 D. densus sumbae (Rensch, 1931) Sumba drongo
Sumba
 D. densus kuehni (E. J. O. Hartert, 1901) Tanimbar drongo
Tanimbar Islands
 D. densus megalornis (G. R. Gray, 1858) Moluccan drongo
Gorong, Watubela Is., and Kai Is., in southwest Moluccas

References

External links
 Photos, videos and observations at Cornell Lab of Ornithologys Birds of the World

Wallacean drongo
Birds of Wallacea
Birds of the Lesser Sunda Islands
Wallacean drongo
Wallacean drongo
Taxonomy articles created by Polbot